Franz-Neumann-Platz (Am Schäfersee) is a Berlin U-Bahn station located on the .

Opened in 1987 and built by R. G. Rümmler, the station was originally supposed to be named Schäfersee. However, politicians convinced the BVG to use the name of a famous SPD chairman.

Notes 

U8 (Berlin U-Bahn) stations
Buildings and structures in Reinickendorf
Railway stations in Germany opened in 1987